Reinier de Ridder (born September 7, 1990) is a Dutch mixed martial artist who competes in the Middleweight division of ONE Championship. He is the former ONE Light Heavyweight World Champion and current ONE Middleweight World Champion.

Since July 25, 2022, Ridder is ranked within the top 10 LHW in the world by Sherdog.

Background 
Reinier de Ridder started with judo at the age of 6. When he started to go to college he wanted to do something with his free time and he liked combat sports a lot, deciding to go into Brazilian Jiu Jitsu. He also owns a physical therapy clinic in Breda, combining his working hours with his training hours.

Grappling career 
De Ridder won a silver medal at the European Championship BJJ in 2016.

De Ridder competed in his first submission grappling match in several years at ONE X on March 26, 2022 against André Galvão. The match went the distance and as the promotion did not use judges for their submission grappling matches at the time, it was declared a draw.

De Ridder is scheduled to compete against Tye Ruotolo in a submission grappling superfight at ONE Fight Night 10 on May 5, 2023.

Mixed martial arts career

Early career 
Reinier had his first amateur fight was in 2013, winning by first round submission, before making his professional MMA debut later that year, winning with a first round triangle choke. Reinier went on a seven fight winning streak with all the fights ending with stoppages. After this winning streak Reinier got the opportunity to fight for his the Middleweight belt in HIT FC, which he won by first round rear-naked choke. After winning his next bout in under two minutes, Reinier got offers from the UFC and ONE FC, deciding to go with the latter due to better terms.

ONE Championship
Reinier made his ONE debut at ONE Championship: Hero's Ascent on January 25, 2019 against Fan Rong, in a fight which he won by a first round submission. He would then face Gilberto Galvao at ONE Championship: Legendary Quest, knocking out Galvao in the second round with knees, and former title contender Leandro Ataides at ONE Championship: Warrior's Code, in which he won a hard fought decision.

ONE Middleweight Champion
On September 9, 2020, it was revealed that Reinier would be fighting for the ONE Middleweight World Championship against champion Aung La Nsang at ONE Championship: Inside the Matrix on October 30, 2020. On October 30, 2020, Reinier won by submission in the first round, becoming the ONE Middleweight World Champion.

Double champion
After Vitaly Bigdash tested positive for COVID-19, Reinier de Ridder stepped in for a rematch against Aung La Nsang at ONE on TNT 4 on April 28, 2021, this time challenging for the ONE Light Heavyweight World Championship. He won the fight by unanimous decision to become the new ONE Light Heavyweight World Champion.

Reinier was scheduled to make his first defense of the ONE Middleweight World Championship against current ONE Welterweight World Champion Kiamrian Abbasov at ONE: Full Circle on February 25, 2022. After applying an arm-triangle choke at the end of the second round that forced Abbasov to tap after the bell, de Ridder ultimately won with the same submission in the third round to retain the ONE Middleweight World Championship. This win earned him the Performance of the Night award.

Reinier faced former multiple-time ADCC and BJJ world champion André Galvão in a grappling match at ONE: X on March 26, 2022. They grappled to a draw after 12 minutes after neither could find the submission.

Reiner defended his  ONE Middleweight World Championship against former champion Vitaly Bigdash on July 22, 2022 at ONE 159. After surviving an early guillotine from Bigdash, Reiner choked him out with an inverted triangle choke in the first round. This win earned him the Performance of the Night award.

Reinier made his third ONE Middleweight Championship defense against promotional newcomer Shamil Abdulaev at ONE on Prime Video 3 on October 21, 2022. However, Abdulaev forced to withdraw due to not medically cleared and the bout was cancelled.

First career loss
Reinier faced Anatoly Malykhin to defend his light heavyweight title on December 3, 2022, at ONE on Prime Video 5. He suffered his first career loss after getting knocked out in the first round, losing the ONE Light Heavyweight World Championship.

Championships and accomplishments

Mixed martial arts
ONE Championship
ONE Middleweight World Championship (One time, current)
Two successful defense 
ONE Light Heavyweight World Championship (One time)
Performance of the Night (Two times) 
2020 Submission of the Year  
Submission of the Night 
Fight of the Night 
2022 Submission of the Year 
Hit Fighting Championship
HIT Middleweight Championship (One time)
360 Promotion
360 Middleweight Championship (One time)

Mixed martial arts record

|-
|Loss
|align=center|16–1
|Anatoly Malykhin
|KO (punches)
|ONE on Prime Video 5
|
|align=center|1
|align=center|4:35
|Pasay, Philippines
|
|-
|Win
|align=center|16–0
|Vitaly Bigdash 
|Technical Submission (inverted triangle choke)
|ONE 159
|
|align=center|1
|align=center|3:29
|Kallang, Singapore
|
|-
|Win
|align=center|15–0
|Kiamrian Abbasov 
|Submission (arm-triangle choke)
|ONE: Full Circle
|
|align=center|3
|align=center|0:57
|Kallang, Singapore
|
|-
|Win
|align=center|14–0
|Aung La Nsang 
|Decision (unanimous)
|ONE on TNT 4
|
|align=center|5
|align=center|5:00
|Kallang, Singapore
|
|-
|Win
|align=center|13–0
|Aung La Nsang 
|Submission (rear naked choke)
|ONE Championship: Inside the Matrix
|
|align=center|1
|align=center|3:26
|Kallang, Singapore
|
|-
|Win
|align=center|12–0
|Leandro Ataides
|Decision (unanimous)
|ONE Championship: Warrior's Code
|
|align=center|3
|align=center|5:00
|Jakarta, Indonesia
|
|-
|Win
|align=center|11–0
|Gilberto Galvao
|KO (knees)
|ONE Championship: Legendary Quest
|
|align=center|2
|align=center|0:57
|Shanghai, China
|
|-
|Win
|align=center|10–0
|Fan Rong
|Submission (brabo choke)
|ONE Championship: Hero's Ascent
|
|align=center|1
|align=center|1:15
|Manila, Philippines 
|
|-
|Win
|align=center| 9–0
|Warren Allison
|Submission (rear naked choke)
|EFC 67
|
|align=center|1
|align=center|2:00
|Johannesburg, South Africa
|
|-
|Win
|align=center|8–0
|Shota Gvasalia
|Submission (rear naked choke)
|Hit Fighting Championship 4
|
|align=center|1
|align=center|3:55
|Horgen, Switzerland
| 
|-
|Win
|align=center|7–0
|Jaouad Ikan
|Submission (armbar)
|World Fighting League MMA
|
|align=center|1
|align=center|N/A
|Almere, Netherlands
|
|-
|Win
|align=center|6–0
|Lamine Talbi
|Submission (rear naked choke)
|360 Promotion: Volition
|
|align=center|3
|align=center|0:41
|Walloon Brabant, Belgium
|
|-
|Win
|align=center|5–0
|Markus Prödl
|TKO (punches)
|Superior FC 16
|
|align=center|2
|align=center|0:51
|Darmstadt, Hesse, Germany
|  
|-
|Win
|align=center|4–0 
|Alexander Heinrich
|TKO (punches & knees)
|Superior FC 15 
|
|align=center|1
|align=center|4:52
|Hesse, Germany
|
|-
| Win
| align=center| 3–0 
| Michaelis Efstratiou
| Submission (arm-triangle choke)
| Superior FC 14
| 
| align=center|1
| align=center|1:32
| Düren, Germany
| 
|-
| Win
| align=center| 2–0
| Rene Hoppe
| Submission (armbar) 
| Rostocker & Benefiz Fight Night
| 
| align=center| 2
| align=center| 1:54
| Rostock, Germany
|
|-
| Win
| align=center| 1–0
| Marco Wuest
| Submission (triangle choke)
| GFC 2
| 
| align=center| 1
| align=center| 4:09
| Lauda-Königshofen, Germany
|
|-

Submission grappling record
{| class="wikitable sortable" style="font-size:80%; text-align:left;"
!  Result
!  Opponent
!  Method
!  Event
!  Division
!  Date
!  Location
|-
|Draw|| André Galvão || Draw || ONE: X||Superfight|| March 26, 2022 || Kallang
|-

See also 
 List of current ONE fighters
 List of male mixed martial artists
 List of undefeated mixed martial artists

References

Notes
 

1990 births
Living people
Dutch male mixed martial artists
Middleweight mixed martial artists
Light heavyweight mixed martial artists
Mixed martial artists utilizing Brazilian jiu-jitsu
Mixed martial artists utilizing judo
Dutch practitioners of Brazilian jiu-jitsu
People awarded a black belt in Brazilian jiu-jitsu
Dutch male judoka
ONE Championship champions